Gata (Azerbaijani: Kətə) is an Caucasian pastry or sweet bread. is a shiny glaze-crusted pastry with a sweet filling made of flour, butter, sugar, and eggs. Gata is a common sweet in the south Caucasus. Traditionally, Gaya was baked in Tandoor. Gata is traditionally eaten at the feast of Candlemas, but is eaten during other festivities too.  

One popular variety of it is koritz (khoriz), a filling that consists of flour, butter and sugar. Gata can have other fillings such as nuts, most commonly walnuts. Some variations include placing a coin inside the dough before the gata is baked, and it is said that whoever receives the piece with the coin is to be blessed with good fortune. Gata from the villages of Garni and Geghard are decorated (before baking), round, and generally about a foot in diameter.  Around the southern edge of Lake Sevan, in the town of Tsovinar, gata is denser and sweeter, and baked without koritz in a triangular shape without decoration.

Different Types of Gata 

Some Gata resemble croissants, made from an enriched bread dough rolled into paper-thin, table-wide sheets using an “okhlavoo” (a wooden dowel dedicated to dough work), smeared with butter, rolled up like a carpet and cut into spirals that bake up layered and crisp. Others are sweeter and decidedly more cake-like, whether they're made with a yeast- or baking soda/acidic dairy-leavened dough (baking powder was, until very recently, unknown in Armenia, so most chemically-leavened baked goods are made using a combination of baking soda and an acidic dairy like yogurt or sour cream). This latter style is usually formed into a flattened disc and filled with a single layer of butter, flour, sugar, vanilla, and (sometimes) chopped nut paste known as khoritz, a mixture that's essentially the Armenian equivalent of streusel. These more simple gata are often dressed up with decorative strips of dough or by scoring patterns onto the top before baking.

In culture
Gata is traditionally eaten during various feasts. For example, during the Christian holiday (Candlemas) in Armenia, and the Iranian holiday Novruz in Iran and Azerbaijan.|

References 

Armenian breads
Sweet breads
Armenian pastries
Azerbaijani cuisine
Iranian cuisine